Dichomeris latescens is a moth in the family Gelechiidae. It was described by Walsingham in 1911. It is found in Mexico (Veracruz, Tabasco).

The forewings are cream-colour, with a slight yellowish tinge. A pale chestnut-brown costal blotch beyond the middle is followed by a series of small chestnut-brown dots around the apex and termen, at the base of the creamy yellowish cilia. A faint chestnut dot lies at the end of the cell. The hindwings are pale greyish cinereous.

References

Moths described in 1911
latescens